Tundra Nenets is a Uralic language spoken in European Russia and North-Western Siberia. It is the largest and best-preserved language in the Samoyedic group.

Tundra Nenets is closely related to the Nganasan and Enets languages, and more distantly to Selkup. Tundra Nenets and its sister language, Forest Nenets, are sometimes considered dialects of a single Nenets language, though there is low mutual intelligibility between the two. In spite of the large area in which Tundra Nenets is spoken, the language is very uniform with few dialectal differences.

Geographically, the Tundra Nenets territory spans the Nenets District of the Arkhangelsk Province, as well as parts of the Komi Republic, the Yamal-Nenets District in the Tyumen Province, and the Ust-Yeniseisk region of the Taimyr District in the Krasnoyarsk Region. This territory has been in constant growth over the past millennium, as Tundra Nenets settlers moved further east and engaged with other groups of Enets.

A 2010 census reported 44,640 Nenets, 49% of whom were speakers of the Nenets language. However, while the population of Nenets has been growing in the past few decades, the language itself has been in a decline, as many children are now educated in Russian-language schools and many other ethnic groups have begun settling in Tundra Nenets territories. The language is classified as 6b (Threatened), indicating that it is still spoken by all age generations, but the number of speakers in decreasing.

Tundra Nenets is spoken primarily within family circles and in traditional economic activities, such as hunting and herding reindeer. The language has no official status within the Russian Federation. In the mid 1930s, an orthography based on the Cyrillic script was developed, which is taught in local schools. However, many Tundra Nenets speakers are primarily literate in Russian. Nonetheless, there is a small amount of Tundra Nenets literature, as well as radio and television broadcasts.

Phonology 
The syllable structure of Tundra Nenets is generally CV(C), and syllables with initial, medial or final consonant clusters of more than two consonants are not allowed.

Vowels 
The number of vowel phonemes in Tundra Nenets is 10, which have 17 distinct allophones governed by palatality, which dominates whole sequences of vowels and consonants. Vowel frontness is not segmentally contrastive.

Monophthong vowels are present in the chart below. Phonemes are marked in bold, with their palatal (on the left) and non-palatal (on the right) allophones marked underneath using the International Phonetic Alphabet.

This and the long close vowels only occur in word-initial syllables.

Vowel reduction 
In much of the literature on Tundra Nenets and its sister dialect, Forest Nenets, a so-called reduced vowel is mentioned. This reduced vowel was thought to have two distinct qualities depending on whether it was found in a stressed or unstressed position. Recently, however, it has become clear that the reduced vowels are in fact short vowels, counterparts to their respective long vowels.

Consonants 
The number of consonant phonemes in Tundra Nenets is 27. All labial and coronal consonants other than the semivowels  and  have plain and palatalized counterparts.

All consonants can be found word-internally between vowels, but their occurrence in other positions is strongly limited.

 Only the 16 consonants shown on darker gray background may occur word-initially.

Sandhi
Tundra Nenets has a phonological process of sandhi: the simplification of consonant clusters, both within words (in e.g. inflection) and between words. This allows considering some of the consonant phonemes secondarily derived from underlying consonant clusters.
 A syllable-final glottal stop  is lost before any obstruent consonants.
 A word-final non-labial nasal  is lost when followed by a sonorant, and becomes a glottal stop utterance finally. Within a word, the cluster  may occur.

As the citation form of a noun is the bare stem, a word ending in a glottal stop in isolation can thus underlyingly end either in a plain glottal stop, or in a nasal. The latter is sometimes called a "nasalizable glottal stop", and is in the orthography of the language written differently from the former.

Syllable structure 
Tundra Nenets has a (C)V(C) syllable structure, and the minimal word is CV. Thus, there are no word initial or word final consonant clusters, nor are there any three-consonant clusters. Moreover, syllables with zero onset typically cannot occur word-initially, but in Western dialects, the word-initial ŋ is lost, giving some vowel-initial words. For example, the Eastern dialect ŋəno 'boat' becomes əno in the Western dialect. Word-internally, zero onset syllables only occur when ə or ° follow another vowel. For example, such vowel clusters can occur when forming the finite stem: me°  'he takes (3SG)' gives meə-s'° 'he took (3SG.PST).'

Stress 
Tundra Nenets displays bisyllabic trochaic feet that are aligned to the left. Primary stress falls on the initial syllable. Secondary stress falls on subsequent odd syllables and on even-position syllables preceding a syllable with °, excluding the final syllable, as illustrated in the following examples where ´ indicates primary stress on a vowel and ` indicates secondary stress on the preceding vowel:

Morphology 
Typical of the Uralic language family, Tundra Nenets has an agglutinating morphological structure with a wide variety of suffixes. There is no prefixation. The two primary word classes are nouns and verbs. Other word classes include adjectives, pronouns, numerals, adverbs, postpositions, conjunctions, particles, and interjections.

A noun can contain up to five morphemes, including the root, a derivational suffix, a possessive suffix, a number suffix, and a case suffix. A verb can contain up to six or seven morphemes, including the root, one or two derivational suffixes, a tense suffix, a mood suffix, a subject agreement suffix, and an object agreement suffix. Although the morphology is predominately agglutinating, there are some suffixes that express multiple meanings, as well as periphrastic clausal negation and some auxiliary verbs.

Derivational affixes 
Tundra Nenets contains a few nominal derivational affixes that can be used to denote a cause, express an instrument, or refer to a location of action. For example,  the noun xərwa-bco 'wish' can be derived from the verb xərwa- 'to want'. There are also several mixed categories of nouns that have a syntactic distribution of a different word-class, yet share other properties with nouns. For example, the proprietive suffix -sawey° can be used to derive nouns with the meaning 'with X, having X', as in yī-sawey° 'intelligent' (from yī 'mind').

Tundra Nenets has two verbal aspectual classes, perfective and imperfective. There are several derivational aspectual suffixes which can change the aspectual class of a verb. For example, imperfectivizing suffixes can be used to express durative, frequentative, multiplicative, and iterative meanings, such as in tola-bə 'to keep counting' (from tola- 'to count'). There are also denominal verbs with the meaning 'to use as X, to have as X', which are formed from the accusative plural stem, such as in səb'i-q''' 'to use as a hat' (from səwa 'hat').

 Inflectional affixes 
Nouns are inflected for number (singular, dual, plural), case (nominative, accusative, genitive, dative, locative, ablative, prolative), and possessive, which can indicate the person and number of the possessor. For example, the following noun is inflected for similative case and third person plural number.

Verbs are inflected for agreement, tense, and mood. Present tense is unmarked, but Tundra Nenets distinguishes inflectionally the past, future, habitual, and future-in-the-past tenses. There are sixteen moods, which include the imperative, hortative, optative, conjunctive, necessitative, interrogative, probabilitative, obligative, potential, and inferential. For example, the verb below is inflected for subjunctive mood, first person singular agreement, and past tense.

 Clitics 
Clitics undergo the same phonological processes and stress assignment as affixes. They can attach to an affirmative finite verb, a negative auxiliary, or a non-verbal final predicate, and follow any other inflection, as shown with the following exclamative clitic:

 Particles 
Particles are primarily used for discourse. Common particles include yekar°q 'it is unknown', ŋod'°q 'hardly', tǣr'i 'just, very', and məs'iq 'maybe, perhaps.' An example is given below:

 Compounding 
There are some lexical noun-noun compounds in Tundra Nenets. As shown in the following example, the first element in the compound can always be modified and take a number. 

 Suppletion 
A few irregular verbs show suppletion. The most frequent suppletive verbs are xǣ- ‘to go, to depart’, ŋǣ- ‘to be’, to- ‘to come’, ta- ‘to bring, to give’ and the negative auxiliary nʹi-. Some common suppletive forms for these verbs are given in the table below.

 Syntax 

 Basic word order 

Tundra Nenets is predominantly a head-final SOV language. Verb finality is the primary constraint on word order. Below are examples of the basic word order for a transitive and intransitive sentence.

However, although most simple sentences have SOV order, a more general trend is for the informationally new element to be immediately preverbal and to be preceded by the informationally old element. So, it is possible to have sentences where the direct object precedes the subject, as illustrated below:

 Possessee + possessor 
The possessor precedes the thing being possessed.

 Adjective (comparative) + standard 

Comparative adjectives follow their standards, which take the ablative case.

 Determiner + noun phrase 

The determiner precedes the noun phrase.

Orthography
The alphabet of Tundra Nenets is based on Cyrillic, with the addition of three letters: Ӈ ӈ, ʼ, and ˮ.

Vowels
The palatalized and plain vowel allophones are distinguished in the original orthography

The Cyrillic orthography does not distinguish the reduced vowel from a, nor the long ī and ū from their short counterparts i and u. ǣ is not found in a palatalized environment, and thus does not show up in the chart. The schwa, has no direct counterpart in the Cyrillic orthography and is in most cases not written.

Consonants
The consonants in the Cyrillic orthography can be seen in the chart below. Note that palatalized consonants are not included.

The letter  marks a "plain" glottal stop, while  marks a glottal stop derived from a word-final n. As in Russian, the consonants are palatalized using the soft sign, .

Sample text(Article 1 of the Universal Declaration of Human Rights)''

References 

Nenets languages
Northern Samoyedic languages